Foamola is an underground musical group from New York City, consisting of Sparrow and his wife, who went by the cyber alias Violet Snow. Also in the group is artist Lawrence Fishberg and Sparrow's daughter, poet Sylvia Gorelick. Their music has been described as "folk-minimalist", and as "anti-Plutarch pop". They attracted media attention for their performance at a 1995 party in honor of Phiber Optik in Manhattan.

Discography

Albums
May I Take a Bath? (self-released cassette, 1992)
Spit on the Dishes (self-released cassette, 1993)

Individual songs
"I've Been Reincarnated Too Many Times" and "John Quincy Adams" - appear on Poemfone: New Word Order (Tomato compilation, 1996)

References

External links
Foamola on Violet Snow's website

American folk musical groups
Musical groups from New York City
Musical groups established in 1991
1991 establishments in New York City